Storm Calysta is an American indie pop music artist, songwriter, model, stylist and creative director.

Career

In 2012 Storm Calysta started to become more well known for her live streams featured on Stickam.com. She attracted over 100,000 viewers every hour by performing her music acoustically live on the web.

In June 2012, Storm toured the Midwest and southern states of the United States with the band We Are Forever. Later that summer, she went on an acoustic tour through the Southern states, performing at venues such as the House of Blues in New Orleans, Louisiana.

After spending so much time touring the southern states, Calysta moved to Texas in 2013. Soon after her move to Texas, she began modeling for small businesses, which has now grown into her modeling and/or styling for larger companies, such as Gucci, Rachel Zoe, Jeffrey Campbell, Free People, American Apparel & several more. She has also been featured on the websites of Vogue, Teen Vogue, Nylon Magazine, W Magazine and more. Storm continues to perform her music, she is currently writing and recording new music.

Discography

Singles
Mushroom Cloud (2018)
Space Cadet (2019)

References

External links

Living people
American women singer-songwriters
American women pop singers
American indie pop musicians
Singer-songwriters from Texas
21st-century American women singers
21st-century American singers
Year of birth missing (living people)